Events in the year 1873 in Argentina.

Incumbents
President: Domingo Faustino Sarmiento
Vice President: Adolfo Alsina

Governors
 Buenos Aires Province: Mariano Acosta 
 Cordoba: Juan Antonio Álvarez
 Mendoza Province: Arístides Villanueva (until 16 October); Francisco Civit (from 16 October)
 Santa Fe Province: Simón de Iriondo

Vice Governors
 Buenos Aires Province: vacant

Events
September - The Argentine Chamber of Deputies approves the Secret Mutual Defense Treaty of 1873 and votes $6,000,000 towards the War of the Pacific.

Births
March 22 - Julieta Lanteri, Italian Argentine physician, freethinker, and women's rights activist (died 1932).  
May 17 - Julio Argentino Pascual Roca, politician and diplomat (died 1942)
October 3 - Vicente Gallo, lawyer, academic and politician (died 1942)

Deaths
August 23 - Félix de la Peña, politician (born 1807 in Argentina, 1807)

References

 
Years of the 19th century in Argentina